The Indian Institute of Technology Mandi (IIT Mandi) is one of  eight newer Indian Institutes of Technology (IITs) established by the Ministry of Human Resource Development (MHRD).  

IIT Mandi is a research university now located in Kamand Valley, Mandi city in Mandi district of Himachal Pradesh and has 132 faculties with 1,655 students enrolled at undergraduate, postgraduate and research level.  Currently, the university has 1,141 alumni. 

Since its inception the institute has been involved with more than 275 Research and Development (R&D) projects worth more than Rs. 120 crore. In the past 10 years, the institute has signed Memorandum of Understanding (MoU) with as many as 11 international and 12 national universities.

History
IIT Mandi's permanent campus (about 14 km from Mandi) is on the left bank of the Uhl River at Kamand and Salgi villages. 

The Foundation Stone was laid on 24 February 2009 and the institution was registered as a society in Uttarakhand on 20 June 2009.  The first batch of 97 students were admitted in July 2009 with classes starting in IIT Roorkee, the mentoring IIT, on 27 July 2009.

A transit campus at Government Post graduate College, Mandi was handed over by the Himachal Pradesh Government on 16 November 2009.

Timothy A. Gonsalves was the founding Director (15/1/2010-30/6/2020), with R. C. Sawhney,  serving as the first Registrar.  

The institute became an IIT under The Institutes of Technology (Amendment) Act, 2011, with the intention to expand the reach and to enhance the quality of technical education in the country.  The Act was passed in the Lok Sabha on 24 March 2011 and by the Rajya Sabha on 30 April 2012.

The Kamand campus ground-breaking ceremony, to mark the start of construction, was held on 12 April 2012. 

On 25 April 2015, IIT Mandi became the first of all the new IITs to completely shift B.Tech. students to its permanent campus in Kamand.

Campus

The campus is split into two halves: the North and South Campus. Proper communication has been facilitated by the college for students, staffs and faculty for communication between north and south campus.

Sports, co-curricular and extra-curricular activities are also of high importance for the institute. In addition to the existing indoor badminton courts, swimming pool, table tennis hall, football and cricket fields and gymnasium, the institute has a pavilion, a hockey ground with kiosk, and tennis, volleyball and basketball courts. The institute has a medical unit in the South campus and a Health Care Center with 3 Medical officers, an ENT specialist, and a Pediatrician, in the North campus. It also includes a Procedure Room, a Minor Operation Theatre and Physiotherapy Center.

The institute has also set up within its campus important support services, such as creches, a botanical garden with a rich diversity of local plants, children's parks, stationery shops, a campus school, canteens, cafes, banks and ATMs, for the convenience of campus residents. Library and book-nooks are also present in both North and South Campus. The auditorium is used for various occasions and programs organised at IIT Mandi.

Technologically Enhanced Services 
The Construction and Maintenance Wing of IIT Mandi uses a web-based project management tool developed in-house by students with an open-source platform to monitor the progress of construction. It also uses an online Ticketing System to manage maintenance services. The institute has established an advanced IT infrastructure including high-speed links of 1 GBPS capacity based on an optical backbone and more than 200 Wi-Fi access points.

The institute has also established a High-Performance Computing Cluster with 160 nodes based on 3000 cores (CPU+GPU) and this continues to grow steadily. Future plans include establishing the Eduroam services (a global service that enables students, researchers and staff from participating institutions to obtain internet connectivity across campus when visiting other participating institutions), Unified Threat Management infrastructure and to extend the backbone infrastructure to 10 GBPS besides developing a disaster recovery site. IIT Mandi has established National Knowledge Network Facilities including Virtual classrooms of 100 plus capacity and Conference Halls in all academic blocks. The academic blocks have spacious classrooms with a capacity ranging from 30 to 300.

The institute houses a Main library with a collection of 18,948 books and a fully automated and Radio-frequency Identification (RFID) enabled Satellite library with 20,000 online resources for students, faculty and staff. Future plans include creating a virtual classroom of 250 capacity and professional Recording Studio besides three conference rooms.

Green activities 
Efficient waste-management practices are held in high priority for the campus. The waste generated at each source is segregated through the active participation of residents. A Bio-gas generator of  feed capacity has been installed for the digestion of biodegradable wastes. Sewage Treatment Plants have been set up to ensure that all waste-water generated in the campus gets suitably treated before discharge and reuse. Special efforts have also been put towards the identification of local flora and fauna, and in ensuring that the campus growth continues to be in harmony with them. Future plans include reuse of treated waste-water, development of plant nursery, better segregation and in-house composting.

The South Campus 

The South Campus is bordered by the Uhl River on the west, Kamand village on the north and Kahra village on the east.  IIT Mandi was the first among all the new IITs to shift residential and academic facilities on the main (South) campus.
A Faculty and Staff Recreation Club in the South Campus was also inaugurated on 29 October 2016. The master plan for the complete development of the campus is ready and intends to cater for 5000 students, 600 faculty and associated staff.

The South Campus at IIT Mandi in Kamand is projected to host all the research facilities in the long run.  Some of the features of the South Campus are:

Academic Buildings 
 A1 : Houses an NKN classroom, some faculty offices, and other small-sized classrooms.
 A2 : The building is known as the AMRC, or the, Advanced Material Research Centre, which is a multi-disciplinary hub for research facilities at IIT Mandi
 A3 : Houses some of the faculty offices and the office of the Dean (Academics).
 A4 : Houses some of the faculty offices and a medium-sized conference room with NKN connectivity.
 A5 : Currently houses the Central Library, 3 PC labs, and a few small-sized classrooms.
 A6 : Apart from housing some of the faculty offices, the building primarily hosts the BioX Centre.
 A7 : Hosts the Director's Office, the Registrar's Office, the Finance and Accounts office, and some faculty offices
 A9 : Houses a big classroom with a capacity of around 200 students.
 SC-NKN : Stable Complex – NKN, or SC-NKN as it is called, the building has a small classroom (having NKN connectivity) along with some other laboratories
 Mechanical Workshop

Residential Complexes 
 Prashar : Boys Hostel
 Nako : Boys Hostel
 Suvalsar : Boys Hostel
 Chandra Taal : Girls Hostel
 Faculty/ Staff Quarters: Residence for some of the faculty and staff in the south campus.

Student dining Hall 
 Cedar Mess : is situated at the center of the campus
 Maple Mess : is situated in the southern part of the campus, catering to the students of the hostels nearby
 D3 Mess : is situated in the South Campus
 S11(Alder) Mess : is situated in North campus of IIT Mandi
 Pine Mess : is situated in centre of the North campus of IIT Mandi
 Oak Mess : is situated in the North campus of IIT Mandi

Eateries 
 Raman Canteen : Usually open from 9 am to around 11.30 pm, the canteen is located near the bus stop of the South Campus.
 Daily Dose Cafe : Situated at the ground floor of the Maple (D2) mess, the newly opened joint serves a variety of snacks (ranging from Pizza, Pasta, Waffles and Doracakes)
 The Priya Canteen : Located inside the Cedar (D1) mess, the canteen mostly serves ready-to-eat items.

Other Offices / Amenities 
 Cricket Ground
 Football Ground
 Sports Complex
 Hockey Ground
 Table Tennis and Badminton Court
 Basketball 
 Volley Ball Court
 Lawn Tennis Court
 Kabaddi Ground

The North Campus 

The North Campus is to host all the students in the long run (with the South Campus catering to the residential and research requirements of the research scholars). At present, all the undergraduate students reside in the North Campus, with some of the postgraduates students also living here.

The North Campus has the following sites :

Residential Complexes 

 Dashir : Boys Hostel
 Beaskund : Boys Hostel
 Chandra Taal : Boys Hostel
 Suraj Taal : Boys Hostel
 Gaurikund : Girls Hostel
 Faculty Housing and Staff Quarters

Academic Buildings 

 A9 Innovation Hub:  This five-storey hub-shaped building has a design & innovation lab and exhibition area on the ground and first floors.  Above this is the registrar's and other administrative offices.  Next is a satellite library and research labs.  The top floor houses the director's office, board room, and research labs.  Radiating up the valley from the hub are the A10-A13 and A11-A14 academic spines.
 A10 : The four story building which houses some of the faculty offices apart from many medium to large sized classrooms.
 A11 : In this building mostly the labs are there .
 A13 : The building hosts the 300 seater classroom in addition to other small to medium-sized classrooms.
 A16 : The Central Library of the institute 
 A18 : Newly build building and mostly first year B.Tech students' classes are held here. And most of the IC courses classes are held here .
 A17 : This building is also for classes of core courses.

Student dining halls 
 Pine Mess : Located near the A10 block
 Oak Mess : Oak Mess is situated on the eastern side of the North Campus
 S11(Alder) Mess : Catering mostly to the residents of the Dashir Hostel blocks and Situated in 3rd floor of A19 building.

Eateries 
 Drongo Canteen
 Tregopan Canteen
 Jassi Canteen
 Amul Parlour

Village Square area 

Holds four major complexes arranged in a circular way overlooking the park type structure :

 The Auditorium Complex : In addition to the 800 seater auditorium, the complex has 3 small lecture halls (with a capacity of around 40–50 students) each.
 The Sports Complex : Hosts badminton, table tennis and Squash courts along with a swimming pool and gym.
 Guest House
 Health Centre
 The Academic Office
 Gymkhana: For all technical and cultural clubs, having different rooms for different clubs.

Other amenities 
 Hockey ground
 Swimming pool
 Megastar Mini Mart
 Squash Court
 Basketball
 Table Tennis
 Badminton Court

Organisation and administration

Schools 
The institute primarily consists of faculty, project associates and students divided across several schools. Currently there are four schools operational in IIT Mandi.

School of Computing and Electrical Engineering
School of Basic Sciences
School of Engineering
School of Humanities and Social Sciences

Business incubators and entrepreneurship
In keeping with its vision of serving society, IIT Mandi has started two business incubators and has a student-run E-Cell.

IIT Mandi Catalyst
IIT Mandi Catalyst is the first technology business incubator (TBI) in Himachal Pradesh.  It was inaugurated by Prof Ashok Jhunjhunwala on 15 May 2016.
IIT Mandi Catalyst offers a low-cost, high-tech, yet peaceful and picturesque destination to early-stage startups.

Enabling Women of Kamand (EWOK)

Enabling Women of Kamand (EWOK) is an innovative programme started by IIT Mandi in May 2016.
  
It focuses on imparting skills training to rural women to enable them to start village-scale businesses.  EWOK has partnered with women from the four panchayats of Kamand, Kataula, Katindhi and Navlaya in Mandi district.

E-Cell (Entrepreneurship Cell)
The E-Cell is a student-run club that provides exposure to entrepreneurship to IIT Mandi students.

Academics
IIT Mandi like all other Indian Institutes of Technology, conducts various programs including bachelor's degree in Technology (B.Tech.). It also offers postgraduate level programs like Master of Science and Master of Science (Research). Further, it also offers a Ph.D. program for cutting-edge research  in basics sciences such as chemical sciences, physical sciences as well as in disciplines of engineering.
The academic year is organized between two semester a year. IIT Mandi follows a 10-point CGPA scale, with a rigorous examination procedure consisting of two mid-semester examinations called Quizzes and an end-semester exam. Apart from that, the courses may involve short projects, term-papers, self-study assignments, tutorials, and regular surprise quizzes.

Undergraduate programs 
Currently(2022–2023), IIT Mandi offers Bachelor of Technology (B.Tech.) programs in six disciplines namely:
 Civil engineering
 Computer science and engineering
 Data science and engineering
 Electrical engineering
 Engineering physics
 Mechanical engineering

The institute also offers a dual-degree program (B.Tech. – M.Tech.) in the following discipline :

 Bio-engineering

Like all the other IITs, admissions to these programs are done on the basis of merit list of JEE-Advanced, the second phase examination of Joint Entrance Examination (JEE), which is an all India engineering entrance examination.

Female enrollment in B.Tech
The Indian Institute of Technology, Mandi, has successfully achieved the target of female enrollment in undergraduate courses by admitting 20.22 percent female students to B.Tech. program for the Academic Year 2019–20. This stands favorably with the target of 17 percent set by the Joint Entrance Examination (JEE) Apex Board Committee for 2019–20.
A total  of 262 students were admitted to IIT Mandi this year in B.Tech. courses, out of which 53 are girls and 209 are boys as compared to 38 girls and 158 boys last year. A total of 103 students have been admitted this year in the M.Sc. courses, of which 36 are girls and 67 are boys. For the Academic Year 2020-2021 a total of 330 students have been admitted in B.Tech. Courses out of which 68 are girls and 262 are boys which gives a 20.61 percent female ratio in B.Tech. this year.

Data regarding the number of women taking admission:

Postgraduate programs 
IIT Mandi also offers postgraduate programs like M.Tech., M.Tech. (by Research), M.Sc., and M.A under various departments. Currently, IIT Mandi offers M.S. program in the field of basic sciences, M.Tech. (by Research) program in the field of engineering, M.A program in Development Studies, M.Sc. program in Physics, Chemistry, Mathematics, and M.Tech. program in CSE, CSP, VLSI, Energy Systems, Materials, Fluid and Thermal, Structural Engineering, and Biotechnology. For any candidate to be eligible for admission, he/she must have a bachelor's degree in Engineering / Technology or master's degree in appropriate Sciences with a valid score in GATE or equivalent national level examination or GRE in appropriate discipline. Shortlisted candidates are called for a personal interview and based on which admission is offered.

IIT Mandi also offers Ph.D. programs in the field of engineering and basic sciences. To be eligible for admission process, the candidate must have a master's degree in sciences with a good academic record and a valid GATE score or UGC/CSIR NET/ Master's degree in Engineering/Technology with a good academic record/ B.Tech. degree of any IIT with a minimum of CGPA of 8.0 on a 10.0 point scale or with a valid GATE Score or B.Tech. / B.E degree of any recognized University in India with a minimum CGPA of 8.0 on a 10.0 point scale or equivalent with valid GATE score.

Strategic partnerships

TUM, Germany

WPI, United States
IIT Mandi has a collaboration program with many foreign universities. Students from WPI, United States come at IIT Mandi to work with IIT Mandi students on 'Interdisciplinary Socio-technical Practicum (ISTP)'. Through the ISTP, students explore the various issues/problems of society, and they propose technology-based solutions for these, and evaluate the proposed solutions from social, technical, economical, environmental and other aspects.

Ranking 

It was ranked 20th among engineering colleges in India by the National Institutional Ranking Framework in 2022.
It was ranked 12th among 23 IITs according to NIRF 2022.

Research
IIT Mandi nurtures an interdisciplinary research environment that develops innovative technologies for widespread use. Driven by the need of the region and the nation, the thrust areas have been identified and organised.

Research centers
The Advanced Materials Research Centre (AMRC) has a focus on the environment and on agriculture particularly for traditional farmers who are engaged in the cultivation of fruits, vegetables, saffron and medicinal plants in this region. The Centre for Design & Fabrication of Electronic Devices (C4DFED) is an institute facility for multidisciplinary research of electronic device design and fabrication. The centre has Class 100, Class 1000 & Class 10000 laboratories where high-end sophisticated electronic device design, fabrication and characterisation tools worth Rs. 50 crore are installed.

Student life

Student Gymkhana and Societies

The Student Gymkhana is the student self-governance body.  It invites student participation and acts as a bridge between the students and the faculty.  It helps in the overall smooth functioning of all student-related activities.  It also assists the students in participating in various student exchange programs and internships.  Student activities at IIT Mandi are grouped into six different societies namely, Academic, Cultural, Literary, Research, Sports and Technical.  Additional activities are grouped in General Affairs under the General Secretary.

The Technical Society includes KamandPrompt (The Programming Club), STAC (The Astronomy Club), Robotronics (The Robotics and Electronics Club), Nirman Club, Yantrik club and E-Cell. Cultural Society includes Art Geeks (Art club), Music club, UDC (Dance club), Dramatics club, Designauts (Design Club), ShutterBugs (The Photography Club), and Perception (The Videography Club).

The Literary Society includes debate, quizzing and writing club of the college. Literary Society also publishes a yearly student's magazine by the name of Vivaan.

The Sports Society has a sports council which coordinates all the sports activities for Football, Cricket, Badminton, Lawn Tennis, Badminton, Table Tennis, Volleyball, Basketball, Hockey, Athletics, and Chess at Kamand Campus.

The Research Society includes IIT Mandi Research Club (IITMRC).

General Affairs includes the Hiking and Trekking Club (HTC).

During their first year, all under-graduate students are required to take part in one of three extra-curricular activities.  These are the Sports Society, the National Service Scheme and the Hiking and Trekking Club.

Student festivals

Xpecto 

Xpecto is the science and technology festival of Indian Institute of Technology Mandi, which has been ramped up to include the most electrifying events, prompting great discoveries, as well as enthralling brainstorming and grand prizes. Each Technical Club will host some exciting events that will highlight and award participants' greatest ideas and breakthroughs.

Exodia 

Exodia is the annual technical cum cultural fest of IIT Mandi. It is a three-day long event held towards the start of March. Started in 2012 by a bunch of enthusiast IITians, it is a student-run non-profit organization that caters primarily to the youth. Exodia '12 and Exodia '13 were set in the transit campus of IIT Mandi. Exodia'14 and Exodia'15 were set on the permanent campus.

Rann-Neeti 
Rann-Neeti is the Annual Inter College Sports Fest of IIT Mandi organised by Student Gymkhana of IIT Mandi. It is a three-day long event held every year in the month of September in which college from states all over the nation participate.

AstraX 
AstraX is the annual inter-college Astronomy meet of IIT Mandi organized by its Space Technology and Astronomy Cell. AstraX observes keynote talks by eminent international and national astrophysicists and astronomers, engaging workshops on space technology and a plethora of interesting events. Students from IITs, IISERs, NITs and many other colleges across India participate in this Astro technical Fiesta.

Ruvaan 
Ruvaan is the annual inter-college Literary Fest of IIT Mandi. It is jointly organized by Writing Club, Drama Club, Debating Club, and Quizzing Club (Literary Society). The first edition of Ruvaan Fest was conducted as a 3-day event from 28 February 2020 to 1 March 2020. This 3-day event is full of a plethora of interesting events including but not limited to Debates, Poetry-Slams, M.U.N., Drama, Quizzes, Movie Screenings, and Poet Conference. Students from colleges across the nation participate in this Literary Fest.

FrostHack 
FrostHack is an open hackathon organized by the student community of IIT Mandi with the goal of solving societal problems by collective collaboration among students using tech.

References

External links

Mandi
Educational institutions established in 2009
Engineering colleges in Himachal Pradesh
Universities and colleges in Himachal Pradesh
Education in Mandi district
2009 establishments in Himachal Pradesh